Tonella is a genus of flowering plants belonging to the family Plantaginaceae.

Its native range is Northern America.

Species:
 Tonella floribunda A.Gray 
 Tonella tenella (Benth.) A.Heller

References

Plantaginaceae
Plantaginaceae genera